Les Cayes, often referred to as Aux Cayes is an arrondissement in the Sud department of Haiti. As of 2015, the population was 346,276 inhabitants.
Postal codes in the Les Cayes Arrondissement start with the number 81.

The arondissement consists of the following municipalities:
 Les Cayes
 Camp-Perrin
 Chantal
 Île à Vache (island)
 Maniche
 Torbeck

References

Arrondissements of Haiti
Sud (department)
Les Cayes